Green Light is a 1937 American drama film directed by Frank Borzage and starring Errol Flynn, Anita Louise, and Margaret Lindsay. The film is adapted from a novel written by Lloyd C. Douglas. The novel is closely related to Douglas' previous book, Magnificent Obsession, which was also adapted as a movie. It was Flynn's first starring role in a studio film that was not an action movie.

Plot
Errol Flynn stars as Dr. Newell Paige, a surgeon whose refusal to name the real culprit in an operation gone fatally awry results in the ruin of his career.  Dismissed from the hospital staff, Paige leaves Massachusetts and travels to Montana to assist a researcher in Rocky Mountain spotted fever, almost dying when he subjects himself to an experimental serum.  Anita Louise stars as Phyllis Dexter, his eventual love interest, and Cedric Hardwicke as Dean Harcourt, an Anglican clergyman and radio preacher whose advice Dr. Paige at first dismisses, then later realizes is the truth.  The film ends with Paige, returned to his former post and cleared of all charges, and Phyllis seated in the cathedral, listening to Dean Harcourt quoting a Psalm, followed by the St. Luke choristers' amen.

Cast

Production
After starring in two swashbuckling films before this; Captain Blood and The Charge of the Light Brigade Flynn had asked Warner Brothers for a regular non-swashbuckling role and this film was the result. However, after this Flynn's next film was The Prince and the Pauper.

Originally Warner Brothers announced that Leslie Howard would be the star and he was scheduled to begin filming Green Light at the end of June, 1935, after completion of his run in The Petrified Forest on Broadway but a persistent bout of boils which repeatedly landed him in the hospital throughout the production made it necessary for Howard to take an extended rest instead. Warner then announced the leads would be Flynn and Olivia de Havilland. De Havilland dropped out and the female leads were then to be played by Anita Louise and Ann Dvorak. Dvorak was then replaced by Margaret Lindsay.

Release

Box office
Released theatrically on February 20, 1937, Green Light was popular at the U.S. box office. According to Warner Bros records, the film earned $1,254,000 domestically and $416,000 foreign, making it the studio's second most popular film of 1937 (the first was The Prince and the Pauper). After completion of the film, Flynn was meant to start in The White Rajah, a biopic of Sir James Brooke based on a script by the actor himself. However this did not eventuate.

Home media
The Warner Archive Collection, a made-on-demand disc branch of Warner Home Video, released the film on DVD-R on November 10, 2010.

References

External links

 
 
 
 

1937 films
Warner Bros. films
Films directed by Frank Borzage
Films produced by Frank Borzage
American black-and-white films
American romantic drama films
1937 romantic drama films
Films about medical malpractice
Films set in Massachusetts
Films set in Montana
1930s English-language films
1930s American films